Albert Francis "Red" Nelson (May 19, 1886 – October 26, 1956) was a pitcher in Major League Baseball. He played for the St. Louis Browns, Philadelphia Phillies, and Cincinnati Reds.

References

External links

1886 births
1956 deaths
Major League Baseball pitchers
St. Louis Browns players
Philadelphia Phillies players
Cincinnati Reds players
Baseball players from Cleveland
Bloomington Bloomers players
Decatur Commodores players
Peoria Distillers players
St. Paul Saints (AA) players
Columbus Senators players
Minneapolis Millers (baseball) players
Montgomery Rebels players
Fargo-Moorhead Graingrowers players